The self-titled album, Under the Influence of Giants is the second studio album by Under the Influence of Giants.

Track listing

"Ah Ha"		- 2:58
"Got Nothing" 		- 3:25
"In the Clouds" 	- 3:43
"Stay Illogical" 	- 4:16
"Mama's Room" 		- 3:52
"Heaven Is Full" 	- 4:56
"I Love You" 		- 3:25
"Against All Odds" 	- 3:10
"Lay Me Down" 		- 3:41
"Faces" 		- 3:39
"Meaningless Love" 	- 5:19
"Can't Stand" (iTunes Download only) 	- 3:35
"Anna Marie" (Rhapsody Download only) - 3:21
"On My Own" (Bonus Track on 2-disc limited edition) - 3:09
"Mama's Room [Richard Vission Rerub Edit] (Bonus Track on 2-disc limited edition) - 3:32

Personnel
Aaron Bruno: vocals
Drew Stewart: guitar
David Amezcua: bass
Jamin Wilcox: drums, keyboard

Produced, Recorded and Mixed by Brad Smith and Christopher Thorn

External links 
 

2006 albums